Running Like the Wind is The Marshall Tucker Band's ninth studio album (including the band's 1978 compilation, Greatest Hits) with its title track, "Running Like the Wind," being one of the band's most popular songs. The more jazzy "Last of the Singing Cowboys" was the single from the album, reaching #42 on the US Billboard Hot 100. It is their first album recorded for Warner Bros. after the collapse of Capricorn Records.

Musical style
In contrast to the band's earlier albums, the sound of Running Like the Wind draws from pop rock. Jazz fusion also plays a part of the album's sound.

Track listing
All songs written by Toy Caldwell except where noted.

"Running Like the Wind" 9:11
"Last of the Singing Cowboys" (George McCorkle) 4:16
"Answer to Love" 3:43
"Unto These Hills" 7:02
"Melody Ann" (Tommy Caldwell) 5:27
"My Best Friend" (McCorkle) 4:58
"Pass It On" 3:46

Charts

Personnel
Doug Gray - Lead vocals and percussion
Toy Caldwell - Electric and acoustic guitars, steel guitar
Tommy Caldwell - Bass guitar and background vocals, lead vocal on "Melody Ann"
George McCorkle - Electric and acoustic guitars, banjo
Jerry Eubanks - Flute, alto, baritone and tenor saxophone, background vocals
Paul Riddle - drums

Credits

Horns: Steve Madaio, Gary Grant, David Leull, Gary Herbig, Bill Reichenbach Jr. (horns arranged by Steve Madaio).
Keyboards: Chuck Leavell
Recorded: Bayshore Recording Studios, Coconut Grove, Florida
Engineer: David Growther
Assistant Engineer: David Growther
Mastered: Bernie Grundman, at A&M
Cover and Inner Spread Photography: David Alexaner
Back Cover Photography: Steve Smith
Cover Concept: The Marshall Tucker Band

References

External links
Levine, Stewart. Running Like the Wind. Ramblin' Records 15095-9705, 1979 (some lyrics included).

1979 albums
Jazz fusion albums by American artists
Marshall Tucker Band albums
Pop rock albums by American artists
Albums produced by Stewart Levine
Warner Records albums